Shahnaz Yaseen Mahmoud Jebreen (born 28 July 1992) is a Jordanian footballer who plays as a midfielder for the Jordan national team.

Club career
At the club level, Jebreen played for Amman and Orthodox in Jordan. She was nominated Best Player of the 2022 WAFF Women's Clubs Championship, in which Orthodox finished runners-up.

International career
Jebreen was part of the Jordan squad that competed at the 2010 Asian Games, where she assisted Jordan's first goal in the tournament scored by teammate Maysa Jbarah. Jebreen also took part in the 2014 AFC Women's Asian Cup.

International goals

Honours 
Individual
 WAFF Women's Clubs Championship Best Player: 2022

References

External links 
 

1992 births
Asian Games competitors for Jordan
FIFA Century Club
Footballers at the 2006 Asian Games
Footballers at the 2010 Asian Games
Footballers at the 2014 Asian Games
Jordan women's international footballers
Jordanian Muslims
Jordanian women's footballers
Living people
Sportspeople from Amman
Women's association football midfielders
Saudi Women's Premier League players